During the First World War, U-boats of the German Imperial Navy and the Austro-Hungarian Navy sank over 6,000 Allied and neutral ships totaling over 14,200,000 tons. Many additional ships that are not included in those totals were damaged, but were able to return to service after repairs. This list contains the approximately 100 ships over 10,000 tons that were either damaged or sunk by U-boats by torpedoes, submarine-laid mines, gunfire, or other means.

List 
Ships listed are presented in descending order on the tonnage figure. Those that were damaged are indicated with an asterisk after their names. Three ships—, and —appear on the list twice. All U-boats listed are German unless otherwise noted in the table.

Kapitänleutnant (Kptlt.) Otto Weddigen in  sank three Royal Navy cruisers that appear on the list—, and —in a little more than an hour during the action of 22 September 1914.

Four U-boat commanders appear four or more times on the list. Kptlt. Hans Rose in  sank two ships and damaged two others between June 1917 and April 1918, while Kptlt. Otto Steinbrinck in  did the same between March and July 1917. Between October 1916 and October 1918, Kptlt. Kptlt. Other notable commanders that appear on the list are Kptlt. Lothar von Arnauld de la Perière (three times) who sank the most tonnage of any submarine commander ever, and Linienschiffsleutnant Georg Ritter von Trapp of the Austro-Hungarian Navy (two times), known as the patriarch of the family made famous in The Sound of Music and its subsequent film adaptation.

Notes

References

Bibliography

 
Lists of World War I ships
Transport-related lists of superlatives
U-boats